Afghan Independence Day is celebrated as a national holiday in Afghanistan on 19 August to commemorate the Anglo-Afghan Treaty of 1919 and relinquishment from British protectorate status. The treaty granted a complete neutral relation between Afghanistan and Britain. Afghanistan had become a British protectorate after the Treaty of Gandamak was signed (1879) in the Second Anglo-Afghan War.

Background 
The First Anglo-Afghan War (1839–42) led to the British force taking and occupying Kabul. After this, due to strategic errors by Elphinstone, the British force was annihilated by Afghan forces under the command of Akbar Khan somewhere at the Kabul–Jalalabad Road, near the city of Jalalabad. After this defeat, the British-Indian forces returned to Afghanistan on a special mission to rescue their prisoners of war (POWs) and afterward withdrew until coming back in order to commence the Second Anglo-Afghan War.

The Second Anglo-Afghan War (1878–80) first led to a British defeat at Maiwand followed by their victory at the Battle of Kandahar, which led to Abdur Rahman Khan becoming the new emir and the start of friendly British-Afghan relations. The British were given control of Afghanistan's foreign affairs in exchange for protection against the Russians and Persians. The Third Anglo-Afghan War in 1919 led the British to give up control of Afghanistan's foreign affairs finally in 1921.

Observances 

 The Taq-e Zafar was built in Paghman to commemorate independence in 1928.
 At the centenary anniversary in 2019, some international landmarks hoisted the Afghan flag tricolor, including the world's tallest building Burj Khalifa in Dubai. The day also coincidenced with the completion of the renovation of the Darul Aman Palace in Kabul, where official celebrations took place.
 On 15 August 2021, the Taliban captured Kabul and reinstated the Islamic Emirate of Afghanistan. During the Afghan Independence Day rallies in Jalalabad and other cities on 18 and 19 August, the Taliban killed three people and injured over a dozen others for removing Taliban flags and displaying the tricolor Afghan flags.

Gallery

See also
Culture of Afghanistan
Hotaki dynasty
Durrani Empire

References 

Public holidays in Afghanistan
Independence days
August observances